Rajaraja Narendra was the Eastern Chalukya king of the Vengi kingdom in South India. Rajaraja Narendra established the city Rajahmahendravaram. His period was famous for Social and Cultural heritage. During the time of Rajaraja Chola I, Rajahmahendravaram was sacked by Western Chalukya. The region witnessed the war between Western Chalukya and other neighbouring dynasties and political support from the Chola dynasty.

Amangai Devi, daughter of Rajendra Chola I, married Rajaraja Narendra, who is the son of Vimaladitya Chalukya. The feudal relationship between the powerful Cholas and Chalukyas continued for three centuries from Arinjaya Chola onwards.

The son of Rajaraja Narendra, Rajendra Chalukya, who is also called Kulottunga Chola I, went on to raid Kedah (Malaysia) for his maternal uncle. He became the king of the Chola empire in Gangaikondacholapuram when a political vacuum occurred and then merged the Chola and Chalukya dynasties. He was a liberal ruler as several land grants were given to the members of the Shudra community who were generals and royal officials during his reign. As he relaxed tax, he was also called 'sungam thavirtha cholan'.

Kubja Vishnuvardhana, the progenitor of Eastern Chalukyas, in his Timmapuram plates claimed to belong to the Manavya gotra. The Aravidu dynasty of Vijayanagara empire claimed descent from Rajaraja Narendra, however, they belonged to the Atreya gotra, unlike their claimed ancestor.

Literary works during his time

The eastern Chalukya Dynasty supported Jainism and Shaivism. Rajaraja Narendra was a Shaivite. He respected religious priests, Tamil,Telugu and Sanskrit languages and religions. Rajaraja Narendra requested his teacher, adviser, and court poet Nannayya Bhattaraka to translate the Mahabharata into Telugu (who was only able to translate two and a half parvas of the epic).

See also
Eastern Chalukyas
Chalukyas
Cholas
Rajamundry
Sarangadhara

References

1061 deaths
Eastern Chalukyas
11th-century Indian monarchs
11th-century Indian people
People from Rajahmundry
Telugu monarchs
Telugu people